The 2009 Canadian Open (also known as the 2009 Rogers Masters presented by National Bank and 2009 Rogers Cup for sponsorship reasons) was a tennis tournament played on outdoor hard courts. It was the 120th edition of the Canada Masters for the men (the 108th edition for the women), and was part of the ATP World Tour Masters 1000 of the 2009 ATP World Tour, and of the Premier 5 of the 2009 WTA Tour. The men's event was held at the Uniprix Stadium in Montreal, Quebec, Canada, from August 8 through August 16, 2009, and the women's event was held at the Rexall Centre in Toronto, Ontario, Canada, from August 15 through August 23, 2009. It was the fourth event for both the men and women on the 2009 US Open Series.

ATP entrants

Seeds

 Seedings are based on the rankings of  August 8, 2009
 Robin Söderling was forced to withdraw due to an elbow injury, so Tomáš Berdych became the no. 17 seed.

Other entrants
The following players received wildcards into the singles main draw
  Bruno Agostinelli
  Frank Dancevic
  Peter Polansky
  Frédéric Niemeyer
The following players received entry from the qualifying draw:
  Alex Bogomolov Jr.
  Jan Hernych
  Julien Benneteau
  Jesse Levine
  Juan Carlos Ferrero
  Alejandro Falla
  Milos Raonic
The following player received the lucky loser spot:
  Andrey Golubev

WTA entrants

Seeds

 Seedings are based on the rankings of August 10, 2009

Other entrants
The following players received wildcards into the singles main draw
  Kim Clijsters
  Valérie Tétreault
  Stéphanie Dubois

The following players received entry from the qualifying draw:
  Elena Baltacha
  Kateryna Bondarenko
  Julie Coin
  Heidi El Tabakh
  Maria Kirilenko
  Alla Kudryavtseva
  Monica Niculescu
  Magdaléna Rybáriková
  Lucie Šafářová
  Yaroslava Shvedova
  Roberta Vinci
  Yanina Wickmayer

Finals

Men's singles

 Andy Murray defeated  Juan Martín del Potro, 6–7(4–7), 7–6(7–3), 6–1.
It was Murray's fifth title of the year and 13th of his career. It was his second Masters 1000 title of the year.
For the first time in the ATP history, all top 8 seeded and top 8 ranked players reached the quarterfinals.

Women's singles

 Elena Dementieva defeated  Maria Sharapova, 6–4, 6–3.
It was Dementieva's third title of the year and 14th of her career.

Men's doubles

 Mahesh Bhupathi /  Mark Knowles defeated
 Max Mirnyi /  Andy Ram, 6–4, 6–3.

Women's doubles

 Nuria Llagostera Vives /  María José Martínez Sánchez defeated  Samantha Stosur /  Rennae Stubbs, 2–6, 7–5, [11–9].

References

External links
Official website

 
Rogers Cup
Rogers Cup
Rogers Cup
Rogers Cup
Rogers Cup
Rogers Cup
Rogers Cup
Canadian Open (tennis)